Humphrey Mieno Ochieng (born 25 December 1989 in Nairobi) is a Kenyan footballer who currently plays for Kenya Premier League side Tusker F.C. and the Kenya national team as a midfielder. He previously played for A.F.C. Leopards, Sofapaka and Kenya Commercial Bank in the Kenyan Premier League, as well as Tunisian side Club Africain and Tanzanian club Azam.

Club career

A.F.C. Leopards
On 13 June 2014, Mieno joined A.F.C. Leopards from Sofapaka for a reported KSh.1.2 million/= (approx. US$13,690 or £8,100 sterling).

Tusker
After only almost seven months with Ingwe, Mieno's transfer to Tusker was announced on 27 January 2015. Criticised on social media for allegedly being lured away from A.F.C. Leopards purely for money and never being guided by his ambitions and contractual obligations, Mieno defended his move to his new club, saying that A.F.C. Leopards failed to pay him his wages for more than three months. He added that it was the same reason he left Sofapaka as well.

Mieno made his debut for Tusker in a 1–1 draw against Thika United at the Thika Municipal Stadium in their first league game of the season on 21 February 2015.

References

External links
 
 
 Humphrey Mieno at Footballdatabase

1989 births
Living people
Sportspeople from Nairobi
Kenyan footballers
Kenyan expatriate footballers
Kenya international footballers
Ligi Ndogo S.C. players
Club Africain players
Sofapaka F.C. players
A.F.C. Leopards players
Azam F.C. players
Gor Mahia F.C. players
Saint George S.C. players
Tusker F.C. players
Association football midfielders
Kenyan expatriate sportspeople in Tanzania
Expatriate footballers in Tunisia
Expatriate footballers in Tanzania
Expatriate footballers in Ethiopia